The Royal Field Artillery (RFA) of the British Army provided close artillery support for the infantry.  It came into being when created as a distinct arm of the Royal Regiment of Artillery on 1 July 1899, serving alongside the other two arms of the regiment, the Royal Horse Artillery (RHA) and the Royal Garrison Artillery (RGA). It ceased to exist when it was amalgamated with the Royal Garrison Artillery in 1924. The Royal Field Artillery was the largest arm of the artillery. It was responsible for the medium calibre guns and howitzers deployed close to the front line and was reasonably mobile. It was organised into brigades, attached to divisions or higher formations.

Notable members
Ernest Wright Alexander, Victoria Cross recipient
Ralph Chetwynd (1890-1957), Canadian businessman and politician, recipient Military Cross 1918
Colin Gubbins (1896–1976), prime mover of the Special Operations Executive (SOE)
Dar Lyon (1898–1964). first-class cricketer
Norman Manley (1893–1969), first Premier of Jamaica, serving from 14 August 1959 to 29 April 1962
Donald McLeod (1882–1917), represented Scotland at football
Cecil Patteson Nickalls, D.S.O. (1877-1925), champion polo player who killed himself with a gun on 7 April 1925 
Alfred William Saunders (1888–1930), World War I flying ace
Garth Neville Walford, Victoria Cross recipient
Francis Wallington, first recipient of the Military Cross four times
Henry Curling, sole British front line officer to survive the Battle of Isandlwana

References

Bibliography

External links
 A List of the formation, attachments and history of each Brigade of the Royal Field Artillery

Royal Artillery
Artillery units and formations of World War I
Units and formations of the Royal Artillery